The Early Winters Ranger Station Work Center in the Okanogan–Wenatchee National Forest near Winthrop, Washington was built in 1936 by the Civilian Conservation Corps.  It was listed on the National Register of Historic Places in 1986 for its architecture.  It was designed by the Northwest Region 6 group of architects of the United States Forest Service, the USDA Forest Svce. Architecture Group.  The listing included nine contributing buildings over a  area, reflecting Rustic architecture.  Building functions included as single dwelling, secondary structure, government office, and warehouse.

References

United States Forest Service architecture
Civilian Conservation Corps in Washington (state)
Park buildings and structures on the National Register of Historic Places in Washington (state)
Government buildings completed in 1936
Buildings and structures in Okanogan County, Washington
Okanogan National Forest
National Register of Historic Places in Okanogan County, Washington